Leslie Irvine may refer to:

Leslie Irvine (sociologist), American sociologist
Leslie Irvine (referee) (born 1958), Northern Irish football referee